Pectenobunus is a genus of harvestmen in the family Sclerosomatidae from South America.

Species
 Pectenobunus paraguayensis (Canestrini, 1888)
 Pectenobunus ruricola (Mello-Leiteo, 1933)

References

Harvestmen
Harvestman genera